Timo Christopher Perthel (born 11 February 1989) is a German professional footballer who plays as a left-back for DSV Leoben.

Career

Werder Bremen
Perthel made his Bundesliga debut on 3 May 2009 for Werder Bremen in a match against 1. FC Köln. He was substituted on in the 72nd minute for Peter Niemeyer. In July 2011, he left Werder to join Hansa Rostock.

Eintracht Braunschweig
In June 2013, he signed a contract with Bundesliga side Eintracht Braunschweig.

Career statistics

References

External links
 
 

1989 births
Living people
People from Kaiserslautern
Footballers from Rhineland-Palatinate
Association football defenders
Association football midfielders
Germany youth international footballers
German footballers
SV Werder Bremen II players
SV Werder Bremen players
SK Sturm Graz players
FC Hansa Rostock players
MSV Duisburg players
Eintracht Braunschweig players
VfL Bochum players
DSV Leoben players
Bundesliga players
2. Bundesliga players
3. Liga players
Austrian Football Bundesliga players
Austrian Regionalliga players
German expatriate footballers
Expatriate footballers in Austria
German expatriate sportspeople in Austria